The Nocton rail crash was a rail accident that happened on 28 February 2002 near Nocton, Lincolnshire, after a vehicle smashed through a wall and fell onto the railway line. The driver, who was trapped in his van, was talking to emergency services on his mobile phone when his vehicle was hit by an oncoming train, killing him. The incident happened exactly a year to the day after the similar Great Heck rail crash.

Details
John Fletcher, a 47-year-old delivery driver, was driving a white Mercedes Sprinter van along a stretch of road parallel to the B1188 near Nocton when he turned off along a disused road. The road had once led towards a bridge over the railway line; however this bridge had been removed in 1968 and the approach to the line was blocked by a brick wall. Despite this, the road camber remained in place. After travelling  along the road, Fletcher's van smashed through the wall and fell  onto the railway, trapping him inside the vehicle.

According to a police statement the van disintegrated into "a thousand pieces if not more". Fletcher died of multiple injuries. The front carriage of the train was derailed, remaining upright. Fourteen of the train's forty-one occupants, including the driver, were taken to Lincoln County Hospital with minor injuries.

References 

Railway accidents in 2002
Railway accidents and incidents in Lincolnshire
2000s in Lincolnshire
February 2002 events in the United Kingdom